Roslyn Schwartz (born 29 September 1951) is a Canadian children's author and animator.

Born in Montreal, Quebec, she was raised in Tunbridge Wells, Kent, England. Schwartz is the author of The Mole Sisters series, The Smoker's Addictionary (1985), Rose and Dorothy (1981), and Tales from Parc la Fontaine (2006). The Mole Sisters was made into a T.V. cartoon series.

She also created two short animated films with the National Film Board of Canada, I'm your Man and The Arkelope.

Schwartz credits much of her success to her younger brother Mark, creator of the traditional winter Poutinikkah festival in Quebec.

References

External links
Annick Press biography

1951 births
Living people
Anglophone Quebec people
Artists from Montreal
Canadian children's writers
Film directors from Montreal
Writers from Montreal
People from Royal Tunbridge Wells
English people of Canadian descent
Canadian women children's writers
English children's writers
English animators
English women writers
Canadian animated film directors
British animated film directors
Canadian women film directors
British women film directors
Canadian women animators
British women children's writers
Canadian expatriates in England